This is a list of fossiliferous stratigraphic units in Zimbabwe.



See also 
 Lists of fossiliferous stratigraphic units in Africa
 List of fossiliferous stratigraphic units in Botswana
 List of fossiliferous stratigraphic units in Mozambique
 List of fossiliferous stratigraphic units in South Africa
 List of fossiliferous stratigraphic units in Zambia
 Geology of Zimbabwe

References

Further reading 
 N. Bertram. 1971. A New Dinosaur Fossil Locality in the Kadsi River Area of the Zambesi Valley. Mennell Society Journal (Detritus) 6:20-21
 G. Bond. 1973. The palaeontology of Rhodesia. Geological Survey of Rhodesia Bulletin 70:1-121
 G. Bond. 1968. The flora of the Black Shale and Coal Group (K2) in the mid-Zambezi Basin. Arnoldia, National Museums of Southern Rhodesia Miscellaneous Publications 3:1-2
 G. Bond, J. F. Wilson, and M. A. Raath. 1970. Upper Karroo pillow lava and a new sauropod horizon in Rhodesia. Nature 227:1339
 E.S. Gaffney and M.C. McKenna. 1979. A Late Permian captorhinid from Rhodesia. American Museum Novitates (2688)1-15
 B. G. Gardiner. 1962. Namaichthys schroederi Gürich and other Palaeozoic Fishes from South Africa. Palaeontology 5(1):9-21
 D. Munyikwa. 1996. Description of the first dinosaurs trackway found in Zimbabwe. Arnoldia Zimbabwe 10(6):36-45
 M. A. Raath. 1972. First record of dinosaur footprints from Rhodesia. Arnoldia 5(37):1-5
 M. A. Raath, C. C. Smith, and G. Bond. 1970. A new Upper Karroo dinosaur fossil locality on the Lower Angwa River, Sipolilo District, Rhodesia. Arnoldia 4(35):1-10
 E. F. Riek. 1974. A fossil insect from the Dwyka Series of Rhodesia. Palaeontologia Africana 17:15-17

Zimbabwe
 
 
Fossiliferous stratigraphic units
Fossil